David Leon Starr (born October 11, 1967) is an American professional stock car racing driver. He competes part-time in the NASCAR Xfinity Series, driving the No. 02 Chevrolet Camaro for Our Motorsports. He has also raced in the Camping World Truck Series, where he is a four-time race winner, and the NASCAR Cup Series in the past.

Racing career

Early career
Starr began by being on a neighbor's pit crew at the age of 14. At the age of 16, he started driving in street stock racing, winning the championship at Big H Motor Speedway in his first year racing. Over the next seven years, Starr won a total of 20 late model races. In 1993, he began driving at the Team Texas driving school and eventually becoming a race instructor. During this time, he worked for Donnie Allison as a crew member on his Busch Series team. He joined the Texas International Driving Association in 1996 and became the first rookie to win a race.

NASCAR
In 1998, Starr made his Truck Series debut driving the No. 9 Chevrolet Silverado for Reher-Morrison Racing in five races. His best finish was 18th at his home track at Texas Motor Speedway. The following season, he competed in the Truck Series full-time. Driving primarily for Tagsby Racing, he also competed for Team 23 Racing, Conely Racing, Morgan-Dollar Motorsports, and McGlynn Racing, and was able to finish 22nd in the standings. Sagby closed its doors at the end of the season, leaving Starr without a full-time ride. He drove most of his races for Conely part-time, as well as for Ware Racing Enterprises and TKO Motorsports, his best finish twelfth at Texas, where he also qualified on the outside pole. That season, he made his Busch Series debut at Talladega for Day Enterprise Racing, finishing 42nd. After running one race for TKO at Daytona International Speedway, he ran four races for Team Menard, finishing no lower than seventh.

Starr earned his second full-time ride in 2002, when he joined the No. 75 Spears Motorsports team. He won his first race at Las Vegas and was named the Series' Most Popular Driver after a fifth-place finish. He was 10th in the standings in 2003 when he suffered injuries and was forced to miss four races. He was still able to post 13 Top 10's that season. Starr also attempted to make his Winston Cup Series debut at Texas Motor Speedway, but failed to qualify.

He won two races in 2004 and moved up to sixth in points. After a winless 2005, Starr left Spears and was rumored to drive the new Hall of Fame Racing NEXTEL Cup ride, but instead signed with the No. 11 team fielded by Red Horse Racing. He won his most recent race at Martinsville Speedway and had a career-best fourth-place points finish. It was reported that he was replaced at Red Horse by Aaron Fike, but team owner Jeff Hammond has stated that Starr was still under contract with the team and would continue to drive for them if they find sponsorship. He  joined Circle Bar Racing for 2007, and drove the No. 10 MaxxForce Diesel Ford with equipment purchased from ppc Racing to a 10th-place points finish with five Top 10's.

He rejoined Red Horse in 2008 and had eight Top 10's. In 2009, Starr joined HT Motorsports in the No. 24 Zachry Toyota Camry  Starr attempted to make his Sprint Cup debut for BlackJack Racing at Fontana in 2009, but did not qualify, and had 14 Top 10 finishes, his highest total since 2004.

For 2010, Starr moved to Randy Moss Motorsports as HT Motorsports closed its doors. Starr had seven Top 10's and was in the Top 10 in points entering the EnjoyIllinois.com 225 at Chicagoland when the team suspended operations due to financial difficulties. Starr picked up a last-minute ride with SS-Green Light Racing in their No. 21 Chevrolet, which was intended to start and park at Chicagoland. However, Starr ran the full race and scored a Top 10 finish. Starr eventually took the No. 81 as well as the Zachry sponsorship with him to SS-Green Light and drove for the team the remainder of the season, scoring a ninth-place points finish. Starr returned to the team for the 2011 season, finishing 13th in points. He also competed in a limited number of races in the Sprint Cup Series for Leavine Family Racing in the No. 95. In his four starts out of 8 attempts, his best finish of 27th was at Bristol Motor Speedway.

For 2012, Starr moved to newly formed Arrington Racing, bringing his sponsor and truck number, the No. 81, with him for the full season. However he was forced to miss races after the midpoint of the season due to a lack of sponsorship.

In 2013 Starr returned to SS-Green Light Racing to attempt the full season, but again had his season truncated due to a lack of sponsorship.

For the 2014 season, Starr joined TriStar Motorsports, driving in the NASCAR Nationwide Series in a partial schedule, before switching to a full-time schedule with the team in 2015. 

In 2015, Starr took over the No. 44 Zachry Toyota full-time. Starr finished a career best finish sixth in the season opener at Daytona. Before the Richmond race, Starr was sick and could not race, being replaced by J. J. Yeley. With Yeley finishing 13th at Richmond, he eventually replaced Starr full-time in the No. 44.

On June 24, 2016, after his release from the No. 44 it was announced that Starr joined RSS Racing to drive the No. 93 Massimo Motors Chevrolet Camaro for the remainder of the 2016 season. Starr finished 27th in his debut with RSS Racing at Daytona, after being involved in a late crash. 

In 2017, Starr left RSS to drive the No. 99 full-time for B. J. McLeod Motorsports, fielded jointly with SS-Green Light. Starr ended up getting his first career Xfinity Series Top 5 in the July race at Daytona, a race he was not even supposed to run. SS-Green Light had planned on replacing Starr with Korbin Forrister for this one race, but when he became ill, Starr got back in the ride, and went on to finish the season in the No. 99. In November, Starr made his return to the Cup Series at the 2017 AAA Texas 500, in which he drove the No. 66 Chevrolet for MBM Motorsports.

In 2018, Starr joined Jimmy Means Racing for a full season, replacing Joey Gase. He returned to the Cup Series to drive the Rick Ware Racing No. 51 car at the 2018 Brickyard 400, where he finished 39th. Starr drove the No. 97 Toyota Camry in Obaika Racing's Cup debut at the 2018 1000Bulbs.com 500 at Talladega. When Starr and Obaika failed to qualify, they attempted the race at Starr's home track of Texas a few weeks later, where they did make the race. He returned to Means in 2019 for another full season in the No. 52.

In 2020, Starr moved to JD Motorsports to drive their No. 6 car, renumbered from the No. 01. He lost his ride with the team on May 18 due to sponsorship problems caused by the COVID-19 pandemic. On June 9, he made his return to the Cup Series in the spring Martinsville race in the No. 53 for Rick Ware Racing. Starr returned to the Xfinity Series with SS-Green Light Racing at Texas in July, driving the No. 07, which was fielded in an alliance with RWR.

Starr joined MBM Motorsports to run the entire Xfinity Series schedule in 2021 except for the season-opener at Daytona in the team's No. 13 car. However, Starr ended up driving MBM's No. 61 for two races (at Phoenix in March and Charlotte in May) when Loris Hezemans drove the No. 13. He also participated at the 2021 Coca-Cola 600 for MBM in their No. 66 car, finishing 38 laps down at 36th place. Following the season finale weekend at Phoenix, Starr, along with team owner Carl Long and seven team members, tested positive for COVID-19.

In 2022, Starr would return to SS-Green Light Racing in the Xfinity Series for multiple races in the No. 08 Ford, and would have a best finish of 11th at New Hampshire Motor Speedway, where he had originally finished 13th before Landon Cassill and Noah Gragson were both disqualified.

In 2023, Starr would run the No. 02 Chevrolet for Our Motorsports on a part-time basis, starting at Daytona.

Personal life
In December 2020, Starr launched the podcast Let's Go Racing with David Starr; Starr is joined by news anchor Tyler Jones and TheRacingExperts.com founder Dominic Aragon.

Starr has mentioned on his podcast he is Catholic. He and his wife Kim have two sons; David Jr. "DJ" and Vance.

Motorsports career results

NASCAR
(key) (Bold – Pole position awarded by qualifying time. Italics – Pole position earned by points standings or practice time. * – Most laps led.)

Cup Series

Xfinity Series

Camping World Truck Series

Winston West Series

 Season still in progress 
 Ineligible for series points

ARCA SuperCar Series
(key) (Bold – Pole position awarded by qualifying time. Italics – Pole position earned by points standings or practice time. * – Most laps led.)

References

External links

 
 

Living people
1967 births
Racing drivers from Houston
NASCAR drivers
A. J. Foyt Enterprises drivers